Ladislav Lubina (11 February 1967 – 13 September 2021) was a Czech ice hockey player and coach. He was drafted by the Minnesota North Stars in the 11th round of the 1985 NHL Entry Draft, but never played in the National Hockey League (NHL).

Playing career
He started to play ice hockey on high level in town of Hradec Králové, then he came to HC Pardubice in 1984–85 and spent over 20 seasons in Czech Extraliga (Czechoslovak). He played mostly for HC Pardubice, but also played for Dukla Jihlava and HC Oceláři Třinec. Lubina was the top league scorer in 1990–91, with 41 goals in 50 games. He left Extraliga in 2006, after a game between HC Pardubice and HC Slavia Praha. Before death he was coaching HC Chrudim.

International play
Lubina played on 1992 Bronze Medal winning Olympic ice hockey team for Czechoslovakia. He also played in the 1990, 1991, 1992 and 1998 IIHF Men's World Championships and 1987 Canada Cup for the same team.

Personal life
On 11 May 2009, Lubina was sentenced to two years probation for a hit and run. He died on 13 September 2021, from brain cancer.

Career statistics

Regular season and playoffs

International

References

External links
 

1967 births
2021 deaths
Czech ice hockey coaches
Czech ice hockey left wingers
Czechoslovak ice hockey left wingers
Deaths from brain tumor
ESV Kaufbeuren players
EV Zug players
HC Chrudim players
HC Dukla Jihlava players
HC Dvůr Králové nad Labem players
HC Dynamo Pardubice players
HC Martigny players
HC Oceláři Třinec players
Ice hockey players at the 1992 Winter Olympics
Lahti Pelicans players
Lausitzer Füchse players
Medalists at the 1992 Winter Olympics
Minnesota North Stars draft picks
Olympic bronze medalists for Czechoslovakia
Olympic ice hockey players of Czechoslovakia
Olympic medalists in ice hockey
People from Dvůr Králové nad Labem
Sportspeople from the Hradec Králové Region
Czechoslovak expatriate sportspeople in Finland
Czechoslovak expatriate sportspeople in Germany
Czechoslovak expatriate ice hockey people
Czech expatriate ice hockey players in Germany
Czech expatriate ice hockey players in Switzerland